Forty Mile Point Light is a lighthouse in Presque Isle County near Hammond Bay on the western shore of Lake Huron in Rogers Township, Michigan USA.

Unlike many Great Lakes lighthouses, Forty Mile Point Light does not mark a significant harbor or river mouth. Rather, it was constructed with the intent that as one sailed from Mackinaw Point to the Saint Clair River, one would never be out of viewing range of a lighthouse. The light is named because it is on 40 mile Point which is  sailing distance from Old Mackinaw Point.

It is part of U.S. Coast Guard District No. 9.

History

In its annual report for the fiscal year 1890, the board recommended that $25,000 be appropriated for the construction of a new light and fog signal at Forty Mile Point near Hammond's Bay, at the approximate midpoint between the two lights.

Congress was unimpressed with the request and it was five years before it was approved and funded. The plan for this light is nearly identical to the one for the 14 Mile Point (Built in 1894 and the Big Bay Point Lighthouse( Built in 1896) both on Lake Superior . The penury of Congress concerning light stations on the Great Lakes was not limited to Forty Mile Point.

The footings are wood pilings, and the structure is  made of red brick, the walls being made with 3 courses of brick, a 2" dead air space and one more course of brick. The house contains two identical apartments (One for the keeper and one for the assistant keeper).

The light was completed in November 1896, but traffic on the Great Lakes is not a year-round event, so it wasn't until the spring (April 1) of 1897 that it was first lit. The station was automated in 1969 and is still operational.  Markings are white with a black lantern.  The original lens was a fourth order Fresnel lens  designed and manufactured by Sauttier And Co. in Paris. It had six bulls-eye flash panels, and the clockwork would rotate it so that it would emit a white flash every ten seconds. This lens was transferred to the new Sand Hills Lighthouse near Eagle River on Lake Superior in 1919   The lens now in place is the second lens to occupy that position. It is a unique lens in that it was made up of parts from at least 3 different lenses. One panel was made by Henry-Lepaute of Paris in 1872. This new lens was a fixed lens with an internal rotating shield mechanism to make a characteristic of 15 seconds on and 15 seconds off. The current characteristic is 3 sec on 3 sec off.  This is the last working classic lens on Lake Huron.

Current operations, maintenance, viewing and events
During the Big Blow of 1905, twenty-seven wooden vessels were lost. There is a Michigan historical marker honoring Forty Mile Light, there is a marker concerning the "Graveyard of Ships". The marker states:
Registered Historical Marker Site L2186 was erected 2007 Forty Mile Point Lighthouse / Graveyard of Ships. The Graveyard of Ships marker states:
Named by seventeenth century French explorers La Mer Douce the sweet or freshwater sea, Lake Huron is the second largest of the five Great Lakes. Violent storms on the "sweet sea" have made it dangerous for ships. As of 2006, 1,200 wrecks had been recorded. During the Big Blow of 1905, twenty-seven wooden vessels were lost. One of these, the steamer Joseph S. Fay, ran aground. A portion of its hull rests on the beach approximately 200 feet north of the Forty Mile Lighthouse. The Great Storm of 1913 was responsible for sinking many modern ships.

A map with the lights in the area is available at lighthousesRus. The park is accessible from the highway—do not turn on to 40 Mile Point road.

The lighthouse anchors one end of a  bike path, the Huron Sunrise Trail, that is near and sometimes in the right of way along US 23, and runs by Hoeft State Park and to Rogers City.  The bike trail was completed in late May 2009.

The lighthouse is owned by Presque Isle County and the museum and gift shop are operated by the 40 Mile Point Lighthouse Society. The park grounds are open to the public year-round from 8.00 AM to sundown. The lighthouse is open for tours from the Friday before Memorial Day through mid October.  Tour hours are Tuesday to Sunday 10:00 a.m. to 4:00 p.m.  More information may be obtained from the Forty Mile Point Lighthouse Society at (989) 734-4907. or https://fortymilepointlighthouse.org

Importantly, the many structures that were part of the installation remain: lighthouse; Lighthouse keeper quarters; barn (bunkhouse)(renovated in 2006-2007 as the gift shop), foghorn signal building (the diaphone has been removed), oil house, and brick outhouse.  The surrounding park also houses the wheelhouse of the first Calcite freighter.

The fourth order Fresnel lens is in place and in use, and access to the tower provides a view of it and the Lakeshore. The Fresnel lens is still operative, being one of only 70 such lenses that remain operational in the United States, less than sixteen of which are use on the Great Lakes of which less than eight are in Michigan.

There are many recurrent events at the lighthouse. A calendar is available. Half of the lighthouse is now a museum, the other half is caretaker's quarters. Membership of the 40-Mile Point Lighthouse Society is $20.00 per year.

Access
 U.S. Route 23
 Huron Sunrise Trail

See also
Lighthouses in the United States

References

Further reading

 Bibliography on Michigan lighthouses.
 Crompton, Samuel Willard  & Michael J. Rhein, The Ultimate Book of Lighthouses (2002) ; .
 Hyde, Charles K., and Ann and John Mahan. The Northern Lights: Lighthouses of the Upper Great Lakes.  Detroit: Wayne State University Press, 1995.    .
 Jones, Ray & Bruce Roberts, American Lighthouses (Globe Pequot, September 1, 1998, 1st Ed.) ; .
 Jones, Ray,The Lighthouse Encyclopedia, The Definitive Reference (Globe Pequot, January 1, 2004, 1st ed.) ; .
 Noble, Dennis, Lighthouses & Keepers: U. S. Lighthouse Service and Its Legacy (Annapolis: U. S. Naval Institute Press, 1997). ; .
 Oleszewski, Wes, Great Lakes Lighthouses, American and Canadian: A Comprehensive Directory/Guide to Great Lakes Lighthouses, (Gwinn, Michigan: Avery Color Studios, Inc., 1998) .
 Penrod, John, Lighthouses of Michigan, (Berrien Center, Michigan: Penrod/Hiawatha, 1998)  .
 
 Putnam, George R., Lighthouses and Lightships of the United States, (Boston: Houghton Mifflin Co., 1933).
 United States Coast Guard, Aids to Navigation, (Washington, DC: U. S. Government Printing Office, 1945).
 
 
 Wagner, John L., Michigan Lighthouses: An Aerial Photographic Perspective, (East Lansing, Michigan: John L. Wagner, 1998)  .
 Wargin, Ed, Legends of Light: A Michigan Lighthouse Portfolio (Ann Arbor Media Group, 2006).  .
 Wright, Larry and Wright, Patricia, Great Lakes Lighthouses Encyclopedia Hardback (Erin: Boston Mills Press, 2006)

External links

 Forty Mile Point Lighthouse Society.
 Detroit News, Interactive map on Michigan lighthouses.
 Interactive map, list, information for lighthouses in North and West Lake Huron.

Lighthouses completed in 1896
Houses completed in 1896
Lighthouses on the National Register of Historic Places in Michigan
Michigan State Historic Sites
Lighthouse museums in Michigan
Museums in Presque Isle County, Michigan
National Register of Historic Places in Presque Isle County, Michigan
1896 establishments in Michigan